Sir David Lindsay of Crawford (died 1355) was a Scottish noble.

David was the son of Alexander Lindsay of Barnweill. For his fathers services in the service of Edward I of England at the Battle of Falkirk, he was granted the former Lindsay lands of Crawford that had been passed by marriage to the Pinkeneys. Crawford was inherited by David.

He signed the Declaration of Arbroath in 1320. David fought at the Battle of Halidon Hill against the English on 19 July 1333. He was the keeper of Edinburgh Castle in 1346. He held the office of Scottish Ambassador to England in 1349. He also held the office of Custodian of Berwick Castle and was the Scottish Ambassador to England in 1351. David died in 1355.

Family and issue
David married Maria de Abernethy, daughter of Alexander de Abernethy and Margaret de Menteith in 1325 and had the following known issue:  
David Lindsay, Master of Crawford (died 1346), without issue.
James Lindsay of Crawford
Alexander Lindsay of Glenesk
William Lindsay of the Byres

Citations

References
 
 

Year of birth unknown
1355 deaths
Medieval Scottish knights
13th-century Scottish people
14th-century Scottish people
Signatories to the Declaration of Arbroath
David